Shaqra is a Syrian village in Izra District in Daraa Governorate. According to the Syria Central Bureau of Statistics (CBS), Shaqra had a population of 487 in the 2004 census.

History
In 1596, Shaqra appeared in the Ottoman tax registers  named Saqra; part of the nahiya of Bani  Bani Kilab in the Hauran Sanjak. It had an entirely Muslim population consisting of 12 households and 7 bachelors. The villagers paid a fixed tax rate of 40% on various agricultural products, including   wheat (3600 akçe), barley (1800), summer crops (1800), goats and beehives (460), in addition to "occasional revenues" (500);  a total of 8,160  akçe. 1/3 of the revenue went to a waqf.

In 1838, it  was noted as Sunni Muslim village, situated "In the Luhf, west of the Lejah".

References

Bibliography

External links
Naoua-map, 20L

Populated places in Izra' District
Villages in Syria